Colin Burgess may refer to:

Colin Burgess (author) (born 1947), Australian author and historian
Colin Burgess (musician) (born 1946), Australian drummer
Colin Burgess (archaeologist) (1938–2014), British archaeologist with a specialization in the Bronze Age